Tacking may refer to:
Tacking (sailing) or coming about, a sailing maneuver
Tacking (law), a legal concept relating to competing priorities between interests arising over the same asset
Tacking (album), a 2005 album by Swedish band The Embassy
"Tackin'", an episode of the American TV series Sit Down, Shut Up

See also 
 
 Tack (disambiguation)